"Somebody Paints the Wall" is a country music song written by Tommy Smith, Charles Browder, Elroy Kahanek, and Nelson Larkin. First released in 1989 by Josh Logan from his album of the same name, it was a number 62 country hit for him that year. A second version was issued by George Jones who recorded the song as "Somebody Always Paints the Wall" on his 1990 album You Oughta Be Here with Me.  then a third by Tracy Lawrence in 1992 from his album Sticks and Stones, and his version was a Top 10 country hit.

Content
"Somebody Paints the Wall" is a mid-tempo in which the narrator comments on his inability to advance on given opportunities: "Seems every time I make my mark / Somebody paints the wall".

Josh Logan version

Josh Logan's rendition was the second single from his 1988 debut album, also titled Somebody Paints the Wall. It was released to radio in 1989, peaking at number 62 on the U.S. country charts.

Chart positions

Tracy Lawrence version

Tracy Lawrence's version was the fourth and final single from his 1991 debut album Sticks and Stones. Released as a single in late 1992, his version was a number 8 country hit in the US, and number 19 in Canada.

Chart positions
"Somebody Paints the Wall" debuted at number 68 on the U.S. Billboard Hot Country Singles & Tracks for the week of October 10, 1992.

Other versions
George Jones recorded the song as "Somebody Always Paints the Wall" on his 1990 album You Oughta Be Here with Me.

References

1989 singles
1992 singles
Josh Logan (country singer) songs
George Jones songs
Tracy Lawrence songs
Song recordings produced by James Stroud
Curb Records singles
Atlantic Records singles
Songs written by Elroy Kahanek
Songs written by Nelson Larkin
1989 songs